Jaime Ovalle or Jayme Ovalle (5 August 1894 – 9 September 1955) was a Brazilian composer and poet.

Ovalle was born in Belem, Brazil.

He was self-taught as a composer. As an officer of the Ministério da Fazenda, he resided mostly in New York and London. He was one of the "Second Nationalist Generation" of Brazilian composers along with Oscar Lorenzo Fernandez (1897-1948) and Walter Burle-Marx (1902-1990).

He died in Rio de Janeiro.

Works, editions and recordings
Ovalle's best known song is Azulão, "bluebird", a canção to a text by Manuel Bandeira. It has been recorded by Conchita Badia, Victoria de los Angeles, Arleen Auger, Montserrat Caballé, Kathleen Battle, Isabel Bayrakdarian, Angela Gheorghiu and many other sopranos. It has also been transposed to be sung by other voices - such as by Gérard Souzay.

Other works:
 Pedro Álvares Cabral (symphonic poem)
 Legenda (for piano)
 Modinha (canção, also to a text by Manuel Bandeira)

References

External links

1894 births
1955 deaths
20th-century composers
20th-century Brazilian poets
20th-century Brazilian male writers
Brazilian composers
Brazilian male poets